Edoardo D'Erme (born 19 April 1989 in Latina, Lazio), better known as Calcutta, is an Italian singer-songwriter. 
He debuted with the album Forse…, released by Geograph Records in 2012.
Its follow-up, Mainstream, was released by Bomba Dischi on 30 November 2015, preceded by the single "Cosa mi manchi a fare". Initially ignored by Italian media, the album started to achieve success after a few months, when its lead single received airplay by Italian radio networks.
The song "Oroscopo", produced by Takagi & Ketra, was released as a stand-alone single in May 2016. Since its release, Calcutta considered the song as something which did not represent himself; despite this, it became his first commercial success and his first single to be certified gold by the Federation of the Italian Music Industry.

In 2018, Calcutta's third studio album, Evergreen, became his first number-one on the Italian Albums Chart. The album spawned singles including "Orgasmo", "Paracetamolo" and "Pesto". 
The album was re-released in 2019, with the singles "Punto" and "Sorriso (Milano Dateo)".

In 2019, Calcutta recorded the single "La luna e la gatta" with producers Takagi & Ketra and fellow singer-songwriters Jovanotti and Tommaso Paradiso.
During his career, he also appeared as a featured artist on the singles "Se piovesse il tuo nome", released in 2018 with Elisa, and "Blue Jeans" (2020), recorded as a duet with Franco126.
He also penned songs for other Italian recording artists, including Francesca Michielin's "Io non abito al mare", Fabri Fibra's "Come mai", Emma's "Latina", Nina Zilli's "Mi hai fatto fare tardi" and Luca Carboni's "Io non voglio".

In 2021, Marracash and Calcutta released the song "Laurea ad honorem" by Marracash, from the album Noi, loro, gli altri. The song was certified Gold by FIMI.

Awards and nominations

References

External links
 

1989 births
Living people
Italian male singer-songwriters
People from Latina, Lazio
21st-century Italian  male singers